An exit control lock, also known as an exit control device, exit lock, or simply an exit control, prevents or deters unauthorized exit.

Typical uses
Exit control locks are often used in retail establishments to deter shoplifting. They are also used in airports and other controlled areas, where people are held until they clear customs or quarantine stations. Exit control locks are also used in libraries, where there is one well-staffed entrance and exit, and a number of other exits that are intended for emergency use only. Exit control devices are often used in hospitals, and can be interfaced to wireless sensors worn by newborn children, so that all exits will lock if a baby is stolen from one of the hospital rooms.

Shops
Often, shops will make an exit emergency use only to deter shoplifting. Usually, the door is locked with an emergency exit button next to it. Pushing the emergency exit button will unlock the door and set the shop's fire alarm off. This deters shoplifting because a person who unlocks the door in order to take an item out of the building when it is not an emergency may be reported to the police, with CCTV footage if available.

Benefits of locking door
Shoplifters will be deterred because using the exit would attract unwanted attention.
Reduces requirements for security guards and security technology (e.g. CCTV, electronic article surveillance gates).

Benefits of not locking door
Increased footfall: Multiple exits will lead to people walking through the shop, and therefore having the shop's products advertised to them, as a shortcut.
Psychological evidence shows that customers feel less relaxed and welcomed if there are signs saying that they are not allowed to do something if there is not an emergency. They can also feel frustrated at having to look for another exit.

Exit control designs
Many exit control locks are based on magnetic locks. One type, delayed egress magnetic locks, will not allow the door to open immediately. This allows a guard to get to the door before the door opens. It will also release if there is a fire alarm or power failure, but otherwise these locks hold the exit doors shut.  These units are common in Alzheimer units.

Exit control systems can include a "request to exit detector" such as a pushbutton that opens the exit if exit requests are enabled.

In other facilities, entrances as well as exits require authentication such as swiping or otherwise reading a card with a card reader. If an intruder slips by the entrance controls of a building, they will be able to be detained for questioning.

References

 

Access control